Lawrence "Larry" J. Pogemiller (born September 18, 1951) is an American politician from Minnesota, and the Commissioner of the Minnesota Office of Higher Education. A member of the Minnesota Democratic-Farmer-Labor Party, he represented northeast Minneapolis districts in the Minnesota Legislature from 1981 to 2011, and served as the Senate's 9th majority leader from 2007 to 2011. As majority leader, he was chair of the Senate Rules Committee and its subcommittees, and also served on the Senate Tax Committee.

Pogemiller was born in Minneapolis and graduated from DeLaSalle High School in 1969. He was first elected to the Minnesota House of Representatives in 1980, serving as the representative of District 55A from 1981 to 1983. After serving one term, he was elected to the Senate in 1982, serving the old District 58 prior to the 1992 redistricting and, thereafter, District 59. He was re-elected in every general election. He was appointed Director of the Higher Education office in October 2011 by Governor of Minnesota Mark Dayton.

Pogemiller is known for his outspoken, assertive leadership style and his strategic thinking. Reporter Tom Scheck of Minnesota Public Radio called him "a brilliant and combative political tactician who often speaks his mind". Former Minnesota House Speaker Steve Sviggum called him "a very frustrating individual as he runs the clock past midnight all the time." Pogemiller had a rocky relationship with former Republican Governor Tim Pawlenty.

References

External links

Senator Lawrence J. Pogemiller Web Page
Minnesota Public Radio – Votetracker: Lawrence Pogemiller Voting Record
Project Vote Smart – Senator Lawrence Pogemiller Profile
Senator Pogemiller Campaign Web Site

Living people
1951 births
University of Minnesota alumni
Harvard University alumni
Democratic Party Minnesota state senators
Democratic Party members of the Minnesota House of Representatives
Politicians from Minneapolis
21st-century American politicians
State cabinet secretaries of Minnesota
DeLaSalle High School (Minneapolis) alumni
Catholics from Minnesota